Jaime Nack (born February 20, 1976 in Columbia, Maryland) is an environmental consultant and marketing specialist who is known for her role as Director of Sustainability and Greening Operations for the 2008 Democratic National Convention in Denver, Colorado and who subsequently managed the plan for the 2012 Democratic National Convention in Charlotte, North Carolina. Marking the first time in DNC history where measures were taken to reduce the environmental impact of the event on the host city, the 2008 greening effort was unprecedented in scale and has evolved into an industry case study for best practices in producing sustainable events. 

In April 2011, Nack received a federal appointment to serve a three-year term on the National Women's Business Council, a bi-partisan federal advisory council created to serve as an independent source of advice and counsel to the President, Congress, and the U.S. Small Business Administration on economic issues of importance to women business owners.  The same year, Nack was also named a Young Global Leader by the World Economic Forum.

2008 Democratic National Convention 
The convention was held in Denver, Colorado, from August 25 to August 28, 2008, at the Pepsi Center. U.S. Senator Barack Obama of Illinois, the nominee for President, gave his acceptance speech on August 28 at INVESCO Field. This was the first time in history that the Democratic National Convention Committee included a sustainability initiative and hired staff to oversee such an effort.  The sustainability and greening effort included a range of focus areas from community engagement to waste diversion on site during the convention via recycling and composting stations.

Career 
Jaime Nack is the Founder and President of Three Squares Inc..
Nack is one of Los Angeles' leading environmental consultants and marketing strategists, having produced and promoted a variety of the city's most prominent and widely-attended events over the last 15 years. Ms. Nack's extensive experience in event production includes producing several large-scale environmental conferences and events which have attracted more than 500,000 attendees. Three Squares Inc. specializes in environmentally-themed events and works with agencies like the U.S. Environmental Protection Agency (US EPA) and South Coast Air Quality Management District to implement their environmental outreach strategies.  Three Squares Inc. has managed the sustainability efforts for many high profile events including the Jon Stewart and Stephen Colbert Rally to Restore Sanity produced by Comedy Central on October 30, 2010.  The Rally took place on the National Mall in Washington D.C. and attracted more than 400,000 attendees.  Press reported on the success of the sustainability plan in the days following.  In addition, Three Squares Inc. also greened the Hollywood premiere and gala for Inception.  Three Squares Inc. was the first firm in the U.S. to certify as ISO 20121 compliant - the international standard for sustainable event management made popular by the London 2012 Olympics.

In 2013, Nack founded her second company in the sustainability arena - One Drop Interactive.  One Drop Interactive is an edtech platform designed to educate and engage employees on core sustainability subjects.

Green Meetings and Events 
Through her work on greening the 2008 Democratic National Convention, Nack became actively involved in developing industry standards for green meetings and events. She joined the effort launched by the US EPA, ASTM and the Green Meeting Industry Council (GMIC) as the Vice-Chair of the Transportation Committee for the APEX/ASTM Environmentally Sustainable Meeting Standards. The standards were launched in 2012 and Nack has delivered talks across the globe educating event planners and producers on the process of integrating the APEX/ASTM Standards.  Nack also led the effort to roll out the international ISO 20121 Event Sustainability Management Systems standard, which was launched prior to the London 2012 Olympics.

Nack also developed the Women In Green Forum to highlight women's impact on the environmental industry.  The Forum, an annual conference and expo, has featured many of the world's leading environmental figures including Mariel Hemingway, Gloria Reuben, Fran Pavley, and Geraldine Knatz. Under her leadership, Nack implemented the plan to demonstrate ISO 20121 compliance for the annual Women In Green Forum marking the first time in history that a U.S. conference achieved this international standard for sustainable event production.

Board memberships 
In 2011, Nack received a federal appointment to serve as a Council Member on the National Women's Business Council.  The National Women’s Business Council (NWBC) is a non-partisan federal advisory council created to serve as an independent source of advice and counsel to the President, Congress, and the U.S. Small Business Administration on economic issues of importance to women business owners.  She is also on the Advisory Board of ArtsEarth Partnership.

Educational experience 
Ms. Nack has a Master's degree in Public Policy/International Trade from UCLA, where she also earned her Bachelor's degree in International Economics with a minor in Urban Planning.  She has also completed executive education programs at Harvard's John F. Kennedy School of Government, Yale University and Oxford.

References

 The Greenest Democratic National Convention of All Time - Denver.Org
 Democratic National Convention Committee Aims For Green Gathering - Article in Information Week.
 Denver and the DNC: A Partnership for Success Case Study.
 Green Meetings in Action: How a Convention Can Change a Destination Presentation at GMIC Annual Meeting
 ArtsEarth Partnership Advisory Board Members.
 Westside Special Olympics Board Members.

External links 
 Three Squares Inc.
 Three Squares Inc. Twitter
 Women In Green Forum
 National Women's Business Council

1976 births
Living people
American consultants